The Longpan Park is a park in Kenting National Park, Hengchun Township, Pingtung County, Taiwan.

Geology
The park faces east to the Pacific Ocean. The park is an open grassland which strong wind often passes by. On the western side lies terrace and coral reef cliffs, on the north lies low hills, on the south lies coral reef terraces and reef coasts and on the east lies isolated mountains, reefs, cliffs, caves, sands, lakes and river delta.

See also
 List of parks in Taiwan

References

Geography of Pingtung County
Parks in Pingtung County
Tourist attractions in Pingtung County